The Gallic Alps were an ancient cultural region located in the Alps and populated mainly by Gauls. The term Celtic Alps is also found in ancient Greek texts. 

History 
After the Roman conquest of the Western Alps (16–15 BC), three provinces were created in the mountain range between Italy and Gallia Narbonensis: Alpes Cottiae, Alpes Maritimae, and Alpes Graiae et Poeninae.

See also 

 Gallia Cisalpina
 Gallia Transalpina, later renamed Gallia Narbonensis
 Gallia Celtica
 Gallia Belgica
 Gallia Aquitania

References

Cultural regions
Pre-Roman Gaul